Nadia Eskandar Zakhary was the Egyptian minister of scientific research between 2 August 2012 and 2013. She was part of the Qandil Cabinet and one of the independent ministers in the cabinet. Zachary was the only member in the cabinet who is a member of the Coptic Christian group, representing about 10% of the population.

Education and career
Zakhary obtained a PhD in Medical Biochemistry from the University of Cairo. She was professor of biochemistry and tumour biology at Egypt's National Cancer Institute. She was also the chair of the Department of Oncology at the Institute of Biology of tumors. She has more than 60 research publications in
international scientific journals. She also served as the minister of scientific research in the interim government headed by Kamal Ganzouri.

References

Living people
Cairo University alumni
Research ministers of Egypt
Qandil Cabinet
Science ministers
Egyptian Copts
Year of birth missing (living people)
Women government ministers of Egypt
21st-century Egyptian women politicians
21st-century Egyptian politicians